Warring Worms is an Atari 2600 video game based on the 1976 arcade game Blockade (the concept of which has since become known as "Snake"). Warring Worms was written by Billy Eno and published in 2002 under the Baroque Gaming label. It was Eno's first released 2600 game.

An updated version was released in 2005 as Warring Worms: The Worm (Re)Turns. It has additional modes such as random mode, in which the game options are randomized between each round. At 8 KB it is double the game's original size of 4 KB.

Gameplay 
Warring Worms is an action game, similar to the Atari 2600 launch title Surround, which itself is based on the 1976 Blockade arcade game.

Like Surround, the player wins a round by forcing the opponent to crash into a wall. The opponent is controlled by either a second player or the game's AI, depending on the game selection. Unlike Surround, players in Warring Worms are armed: each worm can control a cannon that fires shots. The shots can be used to kill the opponent, or take out a block of the "trail" left by either player. The game is played using joysticks, and features 80 game variations.

Reception 
In 2005, Warring Worms was named one of the five "Best 2600 Homebrew Games" in the book Gaming Hacks: 100 Industrial-Strength Tips & Tools by Simon Carless, who described the game as "super-addictive" and praised the ability to fire shots as a "neat twist".

References

External links 
 Warring Worms: The Worm (Re)Turns at AtariAge

2002 video games
Atari 2600 games
Atari 2600 homebrew games
Atari 2600-only games
Snake video games
Video game clones
Video games developed in the United States